Aethalodes verrucosus is a species of beetle in the family Cerambycidae, and the only species in the genus Aethalodes. It was described by Charles Joseph Gahan in 1888.

Subspecies Aethalodes verrucosus formosanus Kriesche, 1924 is endemic to Taiwan.

References

Lamiini
Beetles described in 1888
Beetles of Asia
Insects of Taiwan
Taxa named by Charles Joseph Gahan